Andrea Louise Riseborough (born 20 November 1981) is an English actress and producer. She made her film debut with a small part in Venus (2006), and has since appeared in more prominent roles in Happy-Go-Lucky (2008), Never Let Me Go, Brighton Rock, Made in Dagenham (all 2010), W.E. (2011), Shadow Dancer, Disconnect (both 2012), Welcome to the Punch, Oblivion (both 2013), Birdman (2014), Nocturnal Animals (2016), Battle of the Sexes, The Death of Stalin (both 2017), Mandy, Nancy (both 2018), The Grudge and Possessor (both 2020). For her performance as a recovering addict in the drama To Leslie (2022), Riseborough received a nomination for the Academy Award for Best Actress. 

Outside of film, Riseborough received a BAFTA nomination for her portrayal of Margaret Thatcher in the television film The Long Walk to Finchley (2008), and won critical acclaim for her performances in the Channel 4 miniseries The Devil's Whore (2008) and National Treasure (2016), as well as the BBC One miniseries The Witness for the Prosecution (2016). Her stage credits include August Strindberg's Miss Julie, Shakespeare's Measure for Measure (Theatre Royal, Bath, both 2006) and Anton Chekhov's Ivanov (West End, 2008).

Personal life
Riseborough was born in Wallsend, near Newcastle upon Tyne, the daughter of Isabel Johnson, a secretary, and George Riseborough, a car dealer. She grew up in Whitley Bay. In reference to The Long Walk to Finchley, she has described her parents as "working-class Thatcherites."

She appeared at the People's Theatre, Newcastle upon Tyne, in the play Riding England Sidesaddle by Christopher Goulding, as Celia Fiennes, and was a member of the Young People's Theatre for five years. Riseborough spent her schooldays at the independent school, Newcastle upon Tyne Church High School. She graduated from the Royal Academy of Dramatic Art (RADA) in 2005 and was a member of the National Youth Theatre..

Risenborough in 2020 revealed that she met the 'love of her life', Karim Saleh, while working on the set of Luxor . Previous to that she was reportedly in a long term relationship with Joel Apel from 2009 to 2016 .

Career

Riseborough appeared in the 2010 films Made in Dagenham and Mark Romanek's adaptation of Never Let Me Go. She starred in the American premiere of Alexi Kaye Campbell's The Pride at the Lucille Lortel Theatre in January 2010. The production was directed by Joe Mantello.

She appears in Rowan Joffé's film adaptation of Brighton Rock. She worked with The Devil's Mistress author Peter Flannery on his screenplay based on the life of Angelica Fanshawe. She played the role of Wallis Simpson in W.E., a film directed by Madonna. She stars in Resistance, an adaptation of an Owen Sheers novel. The film was released on 25 November 2011.

She writes with her creative partner, actor Tom Burke, and with Mike Leigh. Riseborough starred in the thriller Hidden, a low-budget film directed by the Duffer Brothers. Hidden was released for streaming September 2015.

She appeared in Oblivion (2013), in a supporting role. She co-starred in the acting ensemble of Birdman (or The Unexpected Virtue of Ignorance), which won the Oscar for Best Picture at the 87th Academy Awards. Riseborough shared the Screen Actors Guild Award for Outstanding Performance by a Cast in a Motion Picture for the film.

She co-starred in apartheid drama Shepherds and Butchers (2016).
She joined the cast of Netflix's Bloodline for season 2, as a series regular character, Evangeline.

She acted as Emma Stone's love interest in the biographical sports film Battle of the Sexes, based on the 1973 tennis match between Billie Jean King and Bobby Riggs. She appeared as Stalin's daughter in the 2017 comedy-drama film The Death of Stalin and was praised by Variety for the "shrewd, multi-layered complexity" of her performance.

She starred in Andrew Heckler's indie feature Burden. She was cast in Waco, a six-part television series about the Waco siege. The first episode was released on 24 January 2018.

Riseborough has been cast in Lone Scherfig's The Kindness of Strangers as an ER nurse who runs an eclectic therapy group. The film started shooting at the Russian Tea Room in the spring of 2018.

She starred in a Sony remake of The Grudge. The film was released on 3 January 2020.

Riseborough starred in the international cocaine trade drama ZeroZeroZero, an eight-part series adapted from the book by Roberto Saviano, which had its debut on Sky in the UK and Amazon Prime in the US in 2020.

She starred in Possessor—written and directed by Brandon Cronenberg—as Tasya Vos, an agent for a secretive organization who uses brain-implant technology to inhabit other people's bodies, driving them to commit assassinations for the benefit of high-paying clients. The film had its world premiere at the Sundance Film Festival in January 2020.

In 2022, Riseborough appeared in the film To Leslie, for which she received critical acclaim and a nomination for the Academy Award for Best Actress. Numerous celebrities praised her performance publicly and on social media, and hosted screenings during the voting period for the Academy Award nominations in January 2023. Her unexpected To Leslie nomination has generated some questions, and without referring to her, the Board of Governors has pledged to "review of the campaign procedures around this year's nominees, to ensure that no guidelines were violated, and to inform us whether changes to the guidelines may be needed in a new era of social media and digital communication."

Acting credits

Film

Television

Theatre

Awards and nominations

References

External links

 
 
 
 Andrea Riseborough at the Royal Academy of Dramatic Art

1981 births
Ian Charleson Award winners
Alumni of RADA
English film actresses
English stage actresses
English television actresses
English radio actresses
English voice actresses
National Youth Theatre members
Living people
Actresses from Newcastle upon Tyne
English Shakespearean actresses
21st-century English actresses
Outstanding Performance by a Cast in a Motion Picture Screen Actors Guild Award winners
Theatre World Award winners